The learning pyramid (also known as “the cone of learning”, “the learning cone”, “the cone of retention”, “the pyramid of learning”, or “the pyramid of retention”) is a group of popular learning models and representations relating different degrees of retention induced from various type of learning. The representations is generally via percentages and discrete layers within a "pyramid of learning". The divide is generally 10, 20, 30, 50 and 90 percent.

Description 
The earliest such representation is believed to originate in a 1954 book called Audio-Visual Methods in Teaching.
A pyramid model was developed by the National Training Laboratories Institute in the early 1960s, on its main campus in Bethel, Maine, for which the original, internal research has been lost. This NTL's learning pyramid model still became a central representation of this concept with a large number of models drawing from it.
This NTL's model generally displays the following representation.

Criticisms 
Criticism emerged on early versions of the model such as Edgar Dale's Cone of Experience. Critics reported inconsistencies between the pyramid of learning and research. The NTL learning pyramid study being lost, the field largely stands on an unknown methodology of unknown quality, with unknown mitigation of influential parameters such as time, population tested, etc., making the original study's results untrustworthy.

References 

Cognitive science
Psychology of learning
Developmental psychology
Intelligence
Neuropsychological assessment